Amardeep Singh Gill (born 8 October 1968) is an Indian director, screenwriter, producer and lyricist associated with Punjabi cinema and Punjabi music.

Early life 
Gill was born on 8 October 1968, to a Jatt-Sikh family in Bathinda, Punjab, but his native village is Gholia Kalan in the Moga district. He has a Master's degree in Punjabi from Punjabi University.

Career 
Gill started his career as a lyricist with hit songs such as Sili Sili Hawa, Je Mille Oh Kudi, Hanju, Socha Vich Tu, Ki Beeti Sade Nal, and Pyar Kar Ke.

In 2014, he directed his first short film, Sutta Naag. Afterwards, he worked as a screenwriter and lyricist in the movie Yoddha: The Warrior.

In 2017, he directed his first film Jora 10 Numbaria which starred Deep Sidhu, Dharmendra, Mukul Dev, Sardar Sohi and Mukesh Tiwari.

Filmography

Discography

Selected Songs as Lyricist only

Book publications 
Arthan Da Jungle (Poems)
Silli Silli Hawa (Songs)
Jora 10 Numbaria (Full Film Script)

Awards and nominations

External links 
 
 Amardeepsinghgill.com

References 

Living people
Punjabi-language film directors
Film directors from Punjab, India
21st-century Indian film directors
Indian songwriters
Indian screenwriters
1968 births